Palmadusta diluculum, the day-break cowry, is a species of sea snail, a cowry, a marine gastropod mollusk in the family Cypraeidae, the cowries.

Description
The shape of these shells is 
somewhat pyriformly ovate, the basic coloration is brown or violet-chesnut, with two or more zones of several white dorsal zigzag-bands and distinctive dark spots on the white base. The extremities are edged with dark chesnut areas. In the living cowry the mantle is thin and smooth. The Palmadusta diluculum virginalis subspecies is smaller, the terminal spots are less accentuated to absent and dark spots on the base are totally missing.

Distribution

This species is widespread throughout the Western Indian Ocean along Sri Lanka, Aldabra, Eritrea, Kenya, Madagascar, the Mascarene Basin, Mauritius, Mozambique, Réunion, the Seychelles, Somalia and Tanzania.

Habitat
This demersal tropical cowry can be found in the intertidal shallow waters in sandy to muddy areas, under stones and blocks of dead coral.

Subspecies
Palmadusta diluculum diluculum Reeve, 1845
Palmadusta diluculum virginalis Schilder & Schilder 1938

References

 Felix Lorenz - Palmadusta diluculum and its close allies
 Reeve 1845: Conchologia Iconica: Shells of Molluscous Animals Vol. III
 Burgess, C.M. (1970). The Living Cowries. AS Barnes and Co, Ltd. Cranbury, New Jersey

External links
 Biolib
 Sealifebase

Cypraeidae
Gastropods described in 1845